Sona is a feminine given name meaning gold. It can also be related to the name Sonia, which means "wisdom." Sona also is called to a beloved one, someone very close to heart. Sona also means beautiful. The name is more common in India, however, can be found in many other communities and nations too (with similar meanings), such as Afghanistan, Armenia, Azarbaijan, and Turkey. Spelling may sometimes defer to 'Suna' or 'سونا'.

People with this given name
Business
Sona Mehring, American businesswoman, founder of CaringBridge

Films and television
Sona Heiden, Indian film actress
Sona MacDonald (born 1961), Austrian-American actress and singer
Sona Nair, Indian film actress mainly in Malayalam films
Soňa Valentová (born 1946), Slovak actress
Sona Movsesian, Armenian American media personality and assistant to late-night talk show host Conan O'Brien

Music
Sona Aslanova (1924–2011), Soviet Azerbaijani soprano
Soňa Červená (born 1925), Czech operatic mezzo-soprano
Sona Ghazarian (born 1945), Armenian-Austrian operatic soprano
Sona Jobarteh, vocalist, multi-instrumentalist, and composer from the Gambia and the UK
Sona MacDonald (born 1961), Austrian-American actress and singer
Sona Mohapatra, Indian singer, music composer, and lyricist
Sona Tata Condé, Guinean musician

Politics
Sona Ram, Indian politician, Colonel

Sports
Sona Ahmadli (born 1988), female wrestler from Azerbaijan
Soňa Nováková (full name Soňa Nováková-Dosoudilová (born 1975), Czech beach volleyball player
Soňa Pertlová (1988–2011), Czech chess player
Sona Shahinyan (born 1992), Armenian professional female football player
Sona Taumalolo (born 1981), Tongan born New Zealand-based rugby union player

Fictional characters
Sona Buvelle, Maven of the Strings, a playable champion character in the multiplayer online battle arena video game League of Legends
Sona Sitri, a character in Highschool DxD
Sona Carstairs, a character in the Shadowhunter Chronicles series

Feminine given names